Küçüklü is a Turkish place name that may refer to the following places in Turkey:

 Küçüklü, Çan
 Küçüklü, Çankırı
 Küçüklü, Gazipaşa, a village in the district of Gazipaşa, Antalya Province
 Küçüklü, Korkuteli, a village in the district of Korkuteli, Antalya Province